Alankrita Shrivastava is an Indian screenwriter, director and producer. Having made her debut as a director in 2011, she has since won accolades such as the Grand Prix at the Créteil International Women's Film Festival and a nomination for a Filmfare Award for the critically acclaimed film Lipstick Under My Burkha.

Shrivastava studied filmmaking at Jamia Milia Islamia in New Delhi and later moved to Mumbai. She began working as an associate director for Prakash Jha. After assisting Jha on notable projects including Apharan (2005) and Rajneeti (2010), Shrivastava made her directorial debut with 2011 film Turning 30. She later received widespread praise for the black comedy Lipstick Under My Burkha, which she directed and wrote. The film earned her, among other accolades, a nomination at the Filmfare Awards.

Early life and education 
Shrivastava was born in New Delhi, but moved to Dehra Dun, Uttarakhand where she attended Welham Girls' School. After completing her schooling, she moved back to Delhi and graduated from Lady Shri Ram College. She later studied filmmaking at the A.J.K. Mass Communication Research Centre at Jamia Millia Islamia.

Career
Shrivastava moved to Mumbai to pursue a career in filmmaking and soon began working as associate director for Prakash Jha. She assisted Jha on such films as Gangaajal, Apaharan, Loknayak, Dil Dosti, Khoya Khoya Chand, and Raajneeti. Following that, she wrote and directed her debut film Turning 30, which was poorly received by critics and audiences.

Shrivastava then wrote the script for Lipstick Under My Burkha in 2012. She submitted the draft for the screenwriter's lab at National Film Development Corporation of India, where she was mentored by Urmi Juvekar. Upon completion, Lipstick Under My Burkha had its world premiere in October 2016 at the Tokyo International Film Festival, was also screened at the Mumbai Film Festival, and had its North American premiere at the Miami International Film Festival in March 2017.

Lipstick Under My Burkha was initially denied a release in India in January 2017, after the Central Board of Film Certification (CBFC) refused a certificate because of the sexual content and language used in the film. Shrivastavaa and her team appealed this decision to the Film Certification Appellate Tribunal (FCAT). Following a discussion which resulted in a few changes in the original cut, FCAT organisation directed the CBFC to issue an A certificate to the film.

Shrivastava spoke of the changes with Agence-France Presse, saying, "I would have loved no cuts, but the FCAT has been very fair and clear. I feel that we will be able to release the film without hampering the narrative or diluting its essence." Lipstick Under My Burkha was released theatrically in India on 21 July 2017 to positive response from film critics and audiences alike.

Personal life
Shrivastava currently lives and works in Mumbai. In an interview with the Bangalore Mirror, she mentioned that she practices Buddhism. Her father died in 2016 after a prolonged illness.

Filmography

Assistant director

References

External links

Living people
Indian women screenwriters
Indian women film directors
Hindi screenwriters
21st-century Indian women writers
21st-century Indian non-fiction writers
Hindi-language film directors
Film directors from Delhi
Jamia Millia Islamia alumni
Lady Shri Ram College alumni
Women artists from Delhi
Screenwriters from Delhi
Film producers from Delhi
Welham Girls' School alumni
21st-century Indian screenwriters
Indian Buddhists
1979 births